The 1958 CCCF Youth Championship was an age restricted association football competition organised by the CCCF (English: Football Confederation of Central America and the Caribbean). All games were hosted in Ciudad de Guatemala and took place between 16 and 25 March.

See also
Football competitions in Guatemala
Football in Central America

References

Under-19 association football competitions
1958 in youth association football